Buccinum humphreysianum, common name Humphrey's buccinum, is a species of sea snail, a marine gastropod mollusk in the family Buccinidae, the true whelks.

Description
The length of the shell varies between 40 mm and 80 mm. The ovate-conical shell is ventricose. Its color is of a reddish white, marked with undulated brown spots with red edges. The epidermis has a bright brown color. The shell is very fine and contains very close transverse striae, crossed by very fine and slightly apparent longitudinal striae. The spire is elongated, pointed and contains eight convex whorls to the spire. These are traversed sometimes by slightly prominent longitudinal folds. The aperture is very effuse, dilated outwardly and widely emarginated at its base. The outer lip is strongly arcuated.

Distribution
This marine species has a wide distribution. It is circumboreal and also found off Japan, North America and Western Europe.

References

External links

Buccinidae
Gastropods described in 1824